This article contains information and statistics about solar eclipses occurring after the modern era, from the 22nd century to the 30th century.

Solar eclipses by century

Longest total eclipses
Below is a list of all total eclipses at least 7 minutes long that will occur between the 22nd and 30th centuries. Of the listed eclipses, the first five are in Solar Saros 139, the next three are in Solar Saros 145, and the final four are in Solar Saros 170.

Notes

References

+22
Future solar eclipses